Murray Park School is a secondary school on Murray Road in  Mickleover, Derby, England. It has about 1050 pupils, most of whom live in the Mickleover and Mackworth areas.

Admissions
It does not have a sixth form.

History
Murray Park was the first school in the UK to have skateboarding on the physical education curriculum in 2007.

Academic performance
2007 results at KS4

Results

5+A*-C              55% 
5+A*-G              95% 
1+A*-G               99% 
Ave points         294 
(Capped to best 8 results)

References

External links
 School website
 EduBase

Secondary schools in Derby
Foundation schools in Derby